Streetlight Harmonies is a 2017 documentary film directed by Brent Wilson. It had its world premiere at the 2017 DOC NYC Film Festival. It was released digitally through Gravitas Ventures and home video on March 31, 2020.

Plot
The film tells the stories of the birth and evolution of Doo-Wop music.

Cast
 Charlie Thomas as himself
 Jay and the Americans as Themselves
 Arthur C. Brooks as himself
 Brian McKnight as himself
 Brian Wilson as himself
 Lance Bass as himself
 Jeff Barry as himself
 Jon Bauman as himself
 Dolores "LaLa" Brooks as herself
 Fred Parris as himself
 Terry Ellis as himself

Reception

Critical response 
On Rotten Tomatoes, the documentary holds an approval rating of 100% based on 9 reviews, with an average rating of 7.8/10.

References

External links
 

2017 films
American documentary films
2017 documentary films
2010s English-language films
2010s American films